Cristian Constantin (born 14 March 1978) is a Romanian former footballer who played as a left midfielder for teams such as Rocar București, ARO Câmpulung, Unirea Urziceni, CS Otopeni or Politehnica Iași, among others.

Honours
Dinamo București
Divizia A: Winner (1) 1999–2000

External links
 
 

1978 births
Living people
Sportspeople from Târgoviște
Romanian footballers
Association football midfielders
Liga I players
Liga II players
CSO Plopeni players
FCM Târgoviște players
AFC Rocar București players
FC Dinamo București players
FC Unirea Urziceni players
CS Otopeni players
FC Politehnica Iași (1945) players
FC Botoșani players
ACF Gloria Bistrița players
Romanian expatriate footballers
Romanian expatriate sportspeople in Germany
Expatriate footballers in Germany